Year 1272 (MCCLXXII) was a leap year starting on Friday (link will display the full calendar) of the Julian calendar.

Events 
 By place 

 Europe 
 February – Charles I of Anjou, king of Sicily, occupies the city of Durrës, and establishes the Angevin Kingdom of Albania. A delegation of Albanian nobles and citizens from Durrës make their way to Charles' court. 
 February 21 – Charles signs a treaty, and is proclaimed King of Albania. He promises to protect the nobles, and to honor the privileges they have from the Byzantine Empire. The treaty declares the union between the Kingdom of Albania (Latin: Regnum Albanie) and the Kingdom of Sicily, under Charles' rule. He appoints Gazo Chinard as his vicar-general, and sends his Sicilian fleet to Achaea, to defend the principality against Byzantine attacks.
 June – Marinid forces land in Spain, and ravage the countryside. They kill and capture many, and plunder livestock. The Marinids attack the castle of Vejer de la Frontera in Andalusia. On hearing the news, King Alfonso X (the Wise) abandons his meeting with Sultan Muhammad I, and orders an all-out war against Granada.
 August 6 – King Stephen V falls ill and is taken to Csepel Island. He dies and is succeeded by his 10-year-old son Ladislaus IV ( the Cuman), who is being held captive in the fortress of Koprivnica in northern Croatia. His mother, Queen Elizabeth, becomes regent during the minority of her son (until 1277).
 November – Charles I orders his officials to take all Genoese prisoner within his territories, except for the Guelphs and to seize their property. The Sicilian fleet occupies Ajaccio on Corsica. Pope Gregory X condemns the aggressive policy of Charles and proposes that the Genoese elect Guelph officials.
 Floris V, count of Holland, makes an unsuccessful attack on Frisia in an attempt to recover the body of his father, William II, who was killed (16 years ago) by the Frisians near Hoogwoud (modern Netherlands). 
 Reconquista: King Afonso III ( the Boulonnais) eliminates the last Moorish community in Portugal at Faro. Completing the reconquest of the West of the Iberian Peninsula.

 England 
 The Worshipful Company of Cordwainers and Curriers are granted rights to regulate the leather trade in the City of London. The Fishmongers Company receive its first Royal Charter.
 November 16 – King Henry III dies at the palace (Westminster Hall) after a 56-year reign. He is succeeded by his son Edward I, who slowly returns from the Holy Land via Gascony.

 Levant 
 May 22 – King Hugh III (the Great) signs a peace with Sultan Baibars, Mamluk ruler of Egypt, at Caesarea. The Kingdom of Jerusalem is guaranteed for 10 years the possession of its present lands, which consists mainly of the narrow coastal plain from Acre to Sidon, together with the right to use without hindrance the pilgrim-road to Nazareth. The County of Tripoli is safeguarded by the peace treaty.
 June 16 – Edward (the Lord Edward) prevents an assassination attempt at Acre. A Syrian Nizari (or Assassin) supposedly sent by Baibars penetrates into the prince's chamber and stabs him with a poisoned dagger. The wound is not fatal, but Edward is seriously ill for some months. Baibars hastens to dissociate himself from the deed by sending his congratulations on the prince's escape.
 August 18 – Nubian forces sack the Egyptian Red Sea outpost of Aydhab and raid the southern frontier city of Aswan. In return, Baibars invades the kingdom of Makuria.

 By topic  

 Astronomy 
 In astronomy, the recording of the Alfonsine tables is completed.

Births 
 January 14 – Hōjō Sadatoki, Japanese regent (d. 1311)
 January 31 – William Ferrers, English nobleman (d. 1235)
 February 12 – Zhao Bing, Chinese emperor (d. 1279)
 May 10 – Bernardo Tolomei, Italian theologian (d. 1348)
 December 13 – Frederick III, king of Sicily (d. 1337)
 Amalric of Tyre, Outremer nobleman and prince (d. 1310)
 Badr al-Din Solamish, Mamluk ruler of Egypt (d. 1291)
 Berthold VII, German nobleman and regent (d. 1340)
 Eric Eriksøn (Longlegs), Danish nobleman (d. 1310)
 Fath al-Din ibn Sayyid, Egyptian theologian (d. 1334)
 Guy de Beauchamp, English nobleman (d. 1315)
 Isabel Bruce, queen consort of Norway (d. 1358)
 Joan of Acre, daughter of Edward I (d. 1307)
 Louis I, French nobleman and knight (d. 1322)
 Margaret of Anjou, French noblewoman (d. 1299)
 Otto I of Hesse, German nobleman (d. 1328)
 Shiwu (or Stonehouse), Chinese poet (d. 1352)

Deaths 
 January 6 – Alfonso of Molina, Leonese prince (b. 1202)
 March 14 – Enzo of Sardinia, king of Sardinia (b. 1218)
 March 17 – Go-Saga, emperor of Japan (b. 1220)
 March 18 – John FitzAlan, English nobleman (b. 1246)
 April 2 – Richard of Cornwall, English nobleman (b. 1209)
 April 27 – Zita (or Sitha), Italian maid and saint (b. 1212)
 May 15 – Thomas of Cantimpré, Flemish priest (b. 1201)
 May 20 – Guy de Bourgogne, French abbot and cardinal
 May 27 – Eric I (Abelsøn), Danish nobleman and knight
 June 10 – Berchtold von Falkenstein, German abbot
 August 6 – Stephen V, king of Hungary (b. 1239)
 August 7 – Richard Middleton, English Lord Chancellor
 September 18 – Peter III de Brus, English nobleman
 October 10 – Yolande of Brittany, French noblewoman
 October 27 – Hugh IV, French nobleman (b. 1213) 
 November 16 – Henry III, king of England  (b. 1207)
 November 19 – David of Augsburg, German friar and mystic
 December 18 – Philip Türje, Hungarian archbishop (b. 1218)
 Amanieu VII, French nobleman and knight (House of Albret)
 Bartholomeus Anglicus, English monk and encyclopedist 
 Berthold of Ratisbon, German monk and preacher (b. 1210)
 Gerard of Abbeville, French monk and theologian (b. 1220)
 Guido Guerra V, Italian nobleman and politician (b. 1220)
 James Audley (or Aldithel), English high sheriff (b. 1220)
 Maud de Prendergast, Norman-Irish noblewoman (b. 1242)
 Nikephoros Blemmydes, Byzantine theologian (b. 1197)
 William of Saint-Amour, French philosopher and writer
 William of Sherwood, English philosopher and logician

References